This list contains songs lyrics written by Turkish lyricist Aysel Gürel.

References 

Gurel